The 2022 Rolex Paris Masters was a professional men's tennis tournament played on indoor hard courts. It was the 50th edition of the tournament, and a Masters 1000 event on the 2022 ATP Tour. It took place at the Accor Arena in Paris, France, from 31 October to 6 November 2022.

Champions

Singles

  Holger Rune def.  Novak Djokovic, 3–6, 6–3, 7–5

Doubles

  Wesley Koolhof /  Neal Skupski def.  Ivan Dodig /  Austin Krajicek, 7–6(7–5), 6–4

Points and prize money

Point distribution

Prize money

*per team

Seeded players
The following are the seeded players. Seedings are based on ATP rankings as of October 24, 2022. Rank and points before are as of October 31, 2022. The entry list was based on ATP rankings as of October 3.

Because the 2021 tournament was non-mandatory, players are defending points from that tournament only if they counted towards their 19 best results as of October 31, 2022. Players who are not defending points from the 2021 tournament will instead have their 19th best result replaced by their points from the 2022 tournament.

Points from the 2021 ATP Finals will also be dropped at the end of the tournament. These points will not be replaced by other results.

† This column shows either the player's points from the 2021 tournament or his 19th best result (shown in brackets). Only ranking points counting towards the player's ranking as of October 31, 2022 are reflected in the column.

Withdrawn players 
The following player would have been seeded, but withdrew before the tournament began.

Other entry information

Wildcards

Protected ranking
  Stan Wawrinka

Withdrawals

Doubles main-draw entrants

Seeds
The following are the seeded teams, based on ATP rankings as of October 24, 2022.

Other entrants

Wildcards

Protected ranking
  Santiago González /  Łukasz Kubot

Alternates

Withdrawals
  Juan Sebastián Cabal /  Robert Farah → replaced by  Adrian Mannarino /  Fabrice Martin
  Thanasi Kokkinakis /  Nick Kyrgios → replaced by  Sebastián Báez /  Albert Ramos Viñolas
  Nikola Mektić /  Mate Pavić → replaced by  Hugo Nys /  Jan Zieliński
  Andrés Molteni /  Diego Schwartzman → replaced by  Miķelis Lībietis /  Luca Margaroli
  Holger Rune /  Stefanos Tsitsipas → replaced by  Sander Gillé /  Joran Vliegen

References

External links
 
 ATP tournament profile

 
Paris Masters
Paris Masters
Rolex Paris Masters
Rolex Paris Masters